Stehelčeves is a municipality and village in Kladno District in the Central Bohemian Region of the Czech Republic. It has about 1,100 inhabitants.

Geography
It lies in the Prague Plateau. An artificial hill known as Buštěhrad slag heap is located in the southern part of the municipality. The Dřetovický Stream flows through the municipality and supplies Vrapický Pond.

History
The first written mention of Stehelčeves is from 1316.

Transport
The D7 motorway runs along the eastern municipal border.

References

External links

Villages in Kladno District